Garra persica is a species of ray-finned fish in the genus Garra from Iran and Iraq.

References 

Garra
Taxa named by Lev Berg
Fish described in 1914